Andrews House may refer to the following places in the United States:

Col. Ralph Andrews House, Beebe, Arkansas
William Andrews House, Napa, California
McHugh–Andrews House, Fort Collins, Colorado
Mosman House, Fort Collins, Colorado, also known as Andrews House
Luman Andrews House, Southington, Connecticut
Moses Andrews House, Meriden, Connecticut
Josiah Andrews House, Des Moines, Iowa
Lt. Robert Andrews House, Bridgton, Maine
French–Andrews House, Topsfield, Massachusetts
Joseph Andrews House, Waltham, Massachusetts
Andrews-Leggett House, Commerce, Michigan
John R. Andrews House, Kasota, Minnesota, NRHP-listed in Le Sueur County
Andrews-Wing House, Boonville, Missouri
Andrews-Moore House, Bunn, North Carolina
Andrews-Duncan House, Raleigh, North Carolina
Heck-Andrews House, Raleigh, North Carolina
Carson-Andrews Mill and Ben F.W. Andrews House, Washburn, North Carolina
Ebenezer Andrews House, Milan, Ohio
Andrews–Luther Farm, Scituate, Rhode Island
Sewall–Andrews House, Mukwonago, Wisconsin, NRHP-listed in Waukesha County
Morey–Andrews House, Waukesha, Wisconsin, NRHP-listed in Waukesha County

See also
H. C. Cohen Company Building–Andrews Building, Rochester, New York
Bishop-Andrews Hotel, Greenville, Florida  
H.O. Andrews Feed Mill, Union, Pennsylvania